Eugene Kirby (died April 27, 2011, at St. Petersburg, Florida) was an American Major League Baseball announcer and front office executive. Kirby was one of the key play-by-play announcers for the Mutual Broadcasting System's Major League "Game of the Day" broadcasts during the late 1940s and 1950s, along with Dizzy Dean, Al Helfer, Art Gleeson and others. According to his obituary in Baseball America, Kirby worked with Dean for almost 20 years at Mutual, ABC and CBS.

While known largely for his work in baseball, Kirby also broadcast American college football and professional and college basketball.

In retirement, he lived in Treasure Island, Florida, where he was a longtime friend of veteran baseball man Don Zimmer. Kirby died at the age of 95 on April 27, 2011. Before he died, he authored a Dizzy Dean biopic entitled “Dizzy: Dean of Baseball & my Podnah” with Mark S. McDonald and Bo Carter.

References

2011 deaths
Year of birth missing
Boston Red Sox executives
American radio sports announcers
American television sports announcers
College basketball announcers in the United States
College football announcers
Major League Baseball broadcasters
Montreal Expos executives
Philadelphia Phillies executives
People from Treasure Island, Florida